Lukas Savickas is a Lithuanian politician who is serving as Member of Seimas and served as Adviser to Prime Minister of Lithuania. He is the fellow of Atlantic Council Millennium Leadership.

Personal life 
He was born in 12 April 1990.

References 

Living people
1990 births
Members of the Seimas
21st-century Lithuanian politicians